The Roman Bridge is an ancient structure in  Trier, Germany, over the Moselle. It is the oldest standing bridge in the country, and the oldest Roman bridge north of the Alps. The nine bridge pillars date from the 2nd century AD, replacing two older, wooden bridges that date at least as far back as 17 BC. In Roman times, tossing a coin off of the bridge into the Moselle was an offering of good luck. The upper part was renewed twice, in the early 12th and in the early 18th century, after suffering destruction in war. Along with other Roman and Early Gothic sites in Trier, the bridge was inscribed on the UNESCO World Heritage List in 1986 because of its historical importance and architecture.

Historical views

Further reading

See also 
 List of Roman bridges
 List of bridges in Germany

References

External links 

 
 Traianus – Technical investigation of Roman public works
 Site of the Römerbrücke in Google Maps

Bridges in Germany
Trier
Deck arch bridges
Stone bridges in Germany
Bridges completed in the 2nd century
Buildings and structures in Trier
History of Trier
Ancient Roman buildings and structures in Germany